Salikoko Mufwene is a linguist born in Mbaya-Lareme in the Democratic Republic of the Congo. He is the Edward Carson Waller Distinguished Service Professor of linguistics at the University of Chicago. Mufwene was elected to the American Philosophical Society in 2022.

Education and career 
Mufwene received his Ph.D. in linguistics from the University of Chicago in 1979.

He has worked extensively on the development of creole languages, especially Gullah and Jamaican Creole, on the morphosyntax of Bantu languages, especially Kituba, Lingala, and Kiyansi (the last of which he speaks natively), and on African American Vernacular English. He has also published several articles and chapters about language evolution.

He is one of the leading figures in research pertaining to the ecology of language, a school of thought that encourages a holistic approach of language studies and combines linguistics with different research fields such as sociology, history, cognitive sciences and biology. One of his main claims (Mufwene 2008) is that languages behave to a certain extent like viruses, and that many analogies can be drawn between the ways they both come to existence, reproduce, evolve, and eventually may go extinct.

Honors and distinctions 

In 2003, Mufwene was awarded a Médaille du Collège de France

In 2018, Mufwene was inducted as a Fellow of the Linguistic Society of America.

In 2022, Mufwene was elected as a fellow to the American Philosophical Society

Mufwene is the editor of the book series Cambridge Approaches to Language Contact, an interdisciplinary series covering diverse perspectives on languages in contact, pidgins, creoles, language evolution, language change, and bilingualism.

Books

References

External links
 Mufwene's University of Chicago web page
 Cambridge Approaches to Language Contact

University of Chicago faculty
Linguists
Living people
Democratic Republic of the Congo emigrants to the United States
Linguists from the Democratic Republic of the Congo
Linguists of pidgins and creoles
Year of birth missing (living people)
Members of the American Philosophical Society
Fellows of the Linguistic Society of America